Bartels is a German and Dutch patronymic surname. The given name Bartel is a vernacular shortform of Bartholomeus. Notable people with the surname include:

 Adolf Bartels (1862–1945), German journalist and poet
 Adolph Heinrich Friedrich Bartels (1819–1878), German-born mayor of Adelaide, Australia
 Adolphe Bartels (1802–1862), Belgian liberal, journalist and writer
  (1915–2002), Dutch politician and state secretary
 Anna Bartels (1869–1950), Swedish opera singer
 Arthur Bartels (born 1971), German mathematician
 Carel Hendrik Bartels (1792–1850), Dutch Gold Coast businessman
 Carl Bernard Bartels (1866–1955), German/British sculptor
 Cornelius Ludewich Bartels (d. 1804), Governor-General of the Dutch Gold Coast from 1798 to 1804
 Edward Bartels (1925–2007), American basketball player
 Fin Bartels (born 1987), German footballer
 Francis Lodowic Bartels (1910–2010), Ghanaian diplomat
 Hans von Bartels (1856–1913), German painter
 Hans-Peter Bartels (born 1961), German politician
 Heinrich Bartels (1918–1944), German World War II flying ace
 Hermann Bartels (1900–1989), German architect
 Imke Bartels (born 1977), Dutch equestrian
 Jayden Bartels (born 2004), American dancer, actress, model, YouTuber and social media personality
 Joanie Bartels (born 1953), American children's musician
 (Johann Christian) Martin Bartels (1769–1836), German mathematician
 John R. Bartels (1897–1997), American judge
 Julius Bartels (1899–1964), German geophysicist and statistician
 Named after him: Bartels, a lunar crater, and Bartels' Rotation Number
 Julius (John) Murray Bartels (1872–1944), philatelist of New York City
 Kerry Anne Bartels (born 1956), Australian politician
 Knud Bartels (born 1952), Danish general
 Kwamena Bartels (born 1947), Ghanaian politician and former Interior Minister
 Larry Bartels (born 1956), American political scientist
 Max Bartels (1871–1936), Dutch plantation owner and naturalist
 Named after him: Bartel's flying squirrel, Bartels's rat, Bartels's spiny rat, Bartels's wood-owl and Max's shrew
 Meike Bartels (born 1973), Dutch psychologist
 Mel Bartels (born 1954), American amateur astronomer
 Named after him: 17823 Bartels, a main belt asteroid
 Michael Bartels (born 1968), German professional racing driver
 Peggielene Bartels (born 1953), Ghanaian chief, wife of a descendant of Carel Hendrik Bartels
 Peter Bartels (born 1941), Australian businessman
 Ralf Bartels (born 1978), German shot-putter
 Tim Bartels (born 1988), German rower
 Tineke Bartels (born 1951), Dutch equestrian
 Wolfgang Bartels (1940–2007), German alpine skier

Ghanaian family 
The Bartels family was an important Euro-African family on the Gold Coast, founded by Cornelius Ludewich Bartels (d. 1804), Governor-General of the Dutch Gold Coast between 1798 and 1804, and his son Carel Hendrik Bartels (1792–1850). Descendants of this family include Charles Francis Hutchison (1879 - ca. 1940) Francis Lodowic Bartels (1910–2010), a Ghanaian educator and diplomat, Kwamena Bartels (born 1947), a former Ghanaian Interior Minister, and Peggielene Bartels (born 1953), a Ghanaian chief.

See also 
 
 Bartel (disambiguation)
 Bartles & Jaymes, an alcoholic beverage

References 

Dutch-language surnames
German-language surnames
Ghanaian families
Patronymic surnames